Synaphea canaliculata is a shrub endemic to Western Australia.

It blooms between August and October producing yellow flowers.

It is found in a small area in the Wheatbelt region of Western Australia around the Lake Grace area where it grows in sandy-loamy soils over laterite.

References

Eudicots of Western Australia
canaliculata
Endemic flora of Western Australia
Plants described in 1995